Orlaith Rafter is an actor, novelist and playwright of Irish descent. She is known to television viewers as the character Robin McKenna in long-running soap opera Fair City.

She was interviewed for the special A Fair City for Love. She is on record as saying she is nothing like her screen character in Fair City. Cars do not interest her and neither do material things.

While away from Fair City, She wrote her first play, Mercury Memory. She is also experimenting with novel writing but intends to eventually return to the screen.

She married IT worker Mick Quinlan in 2011.

See also
 List of Fair City characters

References

External links
 

Irish dramatists and playwrights
Irish romantic fiction writers
Irish soap opera actresses
Living people
Year of birth missing (living people)
Women romantic fiction writers
Irish women novelists
Irish women dramatists and playwrights